Sweet Inn is a French-Israeli travel tech startup company founded in 2014. Active in Europe and in Israel the company offers upscale vacation apartments with hotel services for tourists and business travelers. The company offers a wide range of apartments in several of the world's most popular destinations, including Paris, Barcelona, Milan, Jerusalem, Juan Les Pins, Cannes, Dublin, and London. Each apartment is designed to offer guests a comfortable and stylish home away from home, with amenities such as high-speed Wi-Fi, fully-equipped kitchens, and luxury linens.

As of 2023, Sweet Inn has around 200 employees, and the housing stock includes upwards of 700 apartments.

Description
Sweet Inn is a hospitality company that offers travelers a unique travel experience by combining the convenience and comfort of a hotel with the flexibility and authenticity of an apartment rental. Founded in 2014 by Paul Besnainou, Sweet Inn provides a wide range of apartments in several popular destinations around the world, including Paris, Barcelona, Milan, Jerusalem, Juan Les Pins, Cannes, Dublin, and London. Each apartment is designed to offer guests a comfortable and stylish home away from home, complete with amenities such as high-speed Wi-Fi, fully-equipped kitchens, and luxury linens.

History
In 2014, Paul Besnainou decided to launch Sweet Inn as a new kind of hospitality brand, one which would rent, manage and sublease the apartments combined with an experience worthy of a 5-star hotel.

Sweet Inn designs and refurbishes its own apartments, focusing on "the importance of the design, the central locations in the cities’ typical buildings...". All apartments offer expensive concierge services.Sweet Inn's first rental apartments were situated in Paris, Jerusalem and Tel-Aviv (2014), followed by Brussels, Barcelona, Lisbon and Rome in 2015. Madrid and Milan furthered the company's expansion in 2017, followed by London, Dublin, Seville in 2018. The company aims to expand to other leading European cities and Asia in 2019. In the COVID-19 crisis, Sweet Inn has focused its business model and activities in order to surpass the crisis and reach profitability. In 2022, the company has reached its goal and became profitable, setting the platform for additional growth.

Though initially aimed at tourists, Sweet Inn has been attracting more and more business travelers too  and has created dedicated services for them.

Sweet Inn's mobile app was released in July 2017, allowing customers to book an apartment, get local tips, order a service and chat with a Sweet Inn Guest Relation.

Business model
Sweet Inn operates in the short-term housing rental market, dominated by the peer-to-peer platforms, but has a different business model. 

Since its launch, the company has grown 100% year-over-year. Sweet Inn's personalized service extends beyond its digital platform, with each guest assigned a personal guest relations manager who is available 24/7 to provide assistance and recommendations throughout their stay. The company also offers a range of local experiences and activities designed to help guests explore and experience the culture of their destination. Sweet Inn is committed to providing a digital and personalized guest experience, with an innovative digital platform that allows guests to book their stay, choose their preferred apartment, and customize their experience with additional services such as airport transfers, grocery delivery, and local experiences. The platform also enables guests to communicate with their Sweet Inn team before and during their stay to ensure that their needs are met.

References

External links
 

Hospitality companies of Israel